The 2020 Men's Sentinel Homes Premier Hockey League was the inaugural men's edition of Hockey New Zealand's national league. The tournament was held in Hamilton at the Gallagher Hockey Centre. Competition commenced on 19 November, culminating with finals matches on 6 December.

The Central Falcons won the tournament after defeating the Southern Alpiners 1–0 in penalties after the final finished as a 1–1 draw. The Hauraki Mavericks finished in bronze position, defeating the Northern Tridents 4–1.

Competition format

Format
The 2020 Premier Hockey League saw a new format than that of the former, National Hockey League. Teams played in a double round-robin format during the Pool Stage, which was followed by two Classification Matches.

Following the results of the Pool Stage, the top two ranked teams contested the final, with the bottom two ranked teams playing off for third place.

Point allocation
Match points will be distributed as follows:

 4 points: win
 2 points: shoot-out win
 1 points: shoot-out loss
 0 points: loss

Participating teams
The four teams competing in the league come from the various regions of New Zealand.

 Central Falcons
 Hauraki Mavericks
 Northern Tridents
 Southern Alpiners

Results
All times are local (New Zealand Daylight Time).

Preliminary round

Fixtures

Classification round

Third and fourth place

Final

Awards

Statistics

Final standings

Goalscorers

References

External links

2020 in New Zealand field hockey
New Zealand Premier Hockey League seasons